Sissel is a Norwegian female given name, a variant of Cecilia.

Notable people called Sissel include:
 Sissel Solbjørg Bjugn (1947–2011), a Norwegian poet and children's writer
 Sissel Birgitte Breie (born 1953), a Norwegian diplomat
 Sissel Buchholdt, née Brenne (born 1951), a Norwegian handball player
 Sissel Grottenberg (born 1956), a retired Norwegian long-distance runner
 Sissel Knutsen Hegdal (born 1965), a Norwegian politician for the Conservative Party
 Sissel Kyrkjebø (born 1969), also known as Sissel, Norwegian singer
 Sissel Lange-Nielsen, née Herlofson (born 1931), a Norwegian writer, literary critic, and journalist
 Sissel Lie (born 1942), a Norwegian novelist, translator, playwright and professor in Romance languages and literature at the University of Trondheim
 Sissel Benneche Osvold (born 1945), a Norwegian journalist
 Sissel Vera Pettersen (born 1977, a Norwegian jazz vocalist, saxophonist and composer
 Sissel Rønbeck (born 1950), a Norwegian politician for the Labour Party
 Sissel Sellæg (1928–2014), a Norwegian actress
 Sissel Tolaas, a contemporary Norwegian installation artist most widely known for her work with odours

Fictional characters
 Sissel (Ghost Trick), the male main character in the video game Ghost Trick: Phantom Detective

Food
Jewish rye bread, also called sissel bread

See also
 
 Sissel (album), the 1986 debut album from Sissel Kyrkjebø
 Sissel (2002 album), an album by Sissel Kyrkjebø
 Sandi Sissel (born 1949), an American cinematographer, director and producer
 Sissel v. United States Department of Health & Human Services, a 2014 lawsuit challenging the Patient Protection and Affordable Care Act
 Sissela, a Swedish given name
 Cissel (disambiguation)

References

Norwegian feminine given names